Julia Mayr (born 12 August 1991) is a former Italian tennis player. She is the younger sister of former professional player Evelyn Mayr.

Mayr won eight singles and 12 doubles titles on the ITF Circuit. On 20 September 2010, she reached her best singles ranking of world No. 215. On 29 August 2011, she peaked at No. 225 in the doubles rankings.

ITF Circuit finals

Singles: 14 (8–6)

Doubles: 20 (12–8)

See also
 Evelyn Mayr

References

External links
 
 

1991 births
Living people
People from Olang
Italian female tennis players
Germanophone Italian people
Italian people of German descent
Sportspeople from Südtirol